Jetix Play (formerly Fox Kids Play) was a preschool entertainment brand, owned by Jetix Europe. The Jetix Play name was primarily used as a sister channel to Jetix in a small number of regions, such as Central and Eastern Europe, and Middle East.

History

The channel originally launched as Fox Kids Play in January 2003 in Poland, and later launched in October 2003 in CEE (Including Russia) and MENA regions (including Turkey). Fox Kids Play was aimed at a younger audience than the main Jetix channel and primarily showed archived programming from BVS Entertainment and Fox Kids Europe's catalogues. The channel was available for 12 hours per day, from 6 A.M. to 6 P.M.

On 1 January 2005, Fox Kids Play was rebranded as Jetix Play.

On November 1, 2008, Jetix Play increased its broadcast period from 12 to almost 17 hours per day, from 6 A.M. to 10:45 P.M.

After The Walt Disney Company increased their ownership in Jetix Europe, they planned to rebrand the channels after Jetix's rebranding into Disney XD or Disney Channel. The channel closed on 1 August 2010, in Poland and in Middle East on 1 September 2010.  The channel was replaced with Playhouse Disney/Disney Junior in most regions.

Programming
Programming on Jetix Play consisted of archive programming of animated cartoons and television series from BVS Entertainment's catalogue, which included shows from Saban Entertainment and the pre-1990 catalogue of DIC Entertainment, which BVS/Fox Kids Europe owned international rights to at the time.

Other uses
In the United Kingdom, Fox Kids Europe launched Fox Kids Play as an interactive VOD channel on Telewest in July 2003. The service consisted of various television games based on Fox Kids programmes and third-party properties. The service extended to Sky Digital in March 2004.

In the Netherlands, a Jetix Play branded block was featured on Jetix. Unlike the channel, this block was strictly pre-school-focused and aired acquired shows aimed towards younger children, including The Koala Brothers, Bob the Builder and Strawberry Shortcake. In September 2009, the block began airing In the Night Garden...

Between 2006 and 2007, in Romania and other CEE countries, a Jetix Play programming block was broadcast on Jetix, which similarity to the named channel aired archived programming from BVS's catalogue.

References

Play
Disney television networks
Television channels and stations established in 2003
Television channels and stations disestablished in 2010
Children's television networks
Defunct television channels in Poland
Polish-language television stations
Defunct television channels in Romania
Defunct television channels in Russia
Russian-language television stations
Defunct television channels in Turkey
Turkish-language television stations
Television stations in the Czech Republic
Television channels in Slovakia
Defunct television channels in Slovenia
2003 establishments in Russia
2003 establishments in the Czech Republic
English-language television stations
Romanian-language television stations